Catch as Catch Can is the third studio album by Kim Wilde, released in autumn 1983.

Having toured the UK and Europe in November and December 1982, there was a silence of six months. Kim Wilde returned with the single "Love Blonde", a jazz/swing-inspired track that lyrically mocked the blonde bombshell image that some media had dealt Kim in the previous years. But the sound was unique to the single; the rest of the album continued the electronic theme that was introduced on Select. Most of the songs were again written by Marty and Ricky Wilde, except the second single "Dancing in the Dark", which was written by Nicky Chinn and Paul Gurvitz. Ricky Wilde produced the album.

Some of the songs seemed to be telling a story ("House of Salome", which was released as a single in selected countries, and "Sing It Out for Love") whereas "Dream Sequence" was one of Marty's more imaginative lyrics, describing what seems to be a random sequence of images. The cool blue cover image was provided by photographer Sheila Rock.

The album suffered from mixed reviews in the press and the lack of successful singles. Even a second European tour could not help the decline in sales.

At the time of release, the new compact disc format was introduced. In Japan, the album was released on this new format. In later years, this release became a much sought-after item among Kim Wilde fans, who often paid more than $100 to get their hands on a copy. Elsewhere in the world, the album has been released on CD only once, as part of a 3-CD box set named The Originals (1995). Available for a limited period only, this also has become a collectable item. It was finally re-released on 18 May 2009 as a remastered special edition following Kim Wilde and Select in April.

Critical response

Catch as Catch Can received mixed reviews from contemporary critics. Jessi McGuire of Record Mirror found that the album contained "something for everyone" and praised Ricky Wilde for "showing a constantly changing style" in his songwriting, while comparing Kim's "young and snotty" voice to Michael Jackson's on songs such as the "hot and funky" "Back Street Joe". McGuire was less receptive to the song "Sparks", which was described as coming "dangerously close to sounding like good old Cliff (National Pop Institution) Richard himself". In a negative review, Josephine Hocking of Smash Hits described Wilde's voice as "pretty-but-slight" and panned the album's songs as "a mass of uninspired synth patterns and plodding arrangements."

Track listing
All songs written by Marty Wilde and Ricky Wilde except where indicated.

Side one
 "House of Salome" – 3:36
 "Back Street Joe" – 4:31
 "Stay Awhile" – 3:42
 "Love Blonde" – 4:08
 "Dream Sequence" – 6:06

Side two
 "Dancing in the Dark" (Nicky Chinn, Paul Gurvitz) – 3:44
 "Shoot to Disable" – 3:37
 "Can You Hear It" – 4:29
 "Sparks" – 4:08
 "Sing It Out for Love" – 3:34

Bonus tracks (2009 remastered CD edition)

 "Love Blonde" (7" version)
 "Back Street Driver" ("Dancing in the Dark" B-side)
 "Love Blonde" (12" version)
 "Dancing in the Dark" (Nile Rodgers Re-Mix) (Chinn, Gurvitz)
 "Dancing in the Dark" (Instrumental) (Chinn, Gurvitz)

Personnel 
 Kim Wilde – vocals, Prophet-5, Fairlight CMI, E-mu Emulator II, Roland Jupiter 8, Roland System 700
 Ricky Wilde – keyboards, Synclavier, guitars, bass, Roland MC-8 Microcomposer, LinnDrum programming
 Steve Byrd – lead guitars
 Mark Hayward Chaplin – bass
 Trevor Murrell – drums
 Gary Barnacle – saxophones, flute

Production 
 Ricky Wilde – producer 
 Keith Fernley, Will Gosling, Simon Schofield and Pete Schwier – engineers
 Nile Rodgers – mixing on "Dancing in the Dark"
 Chris Dickie, Mike Nocito and Dietmar Schillinger – tape ops
 Malcolm Garrett – album design 
 Sheila Rock – photography

Charts

Certifications and sales

|}

References

1983 albums
Kim Wilde albums
Rak Records albums
New wave albums by English artists
Albums recorded at RAK Studios